Herminio Rafael Toñánez Almada (born 9 March 1946 in Paraguay) is a former football defender.

Career
He started his career at Nacional of Paraguay making his debut with the first team in 1963, before being transferred to Sevilla FC of Spain in 1969. Toñánez also played for Recreativo Huelva and Principado de Andorra of the Catalonia 3rd division region. His career ended in Australian side St George Saints where he only spent a month due to a disagreement in the contract.

References

External links
LFP Profile

1946 births
Living people
Paraguayan footballers
Paraguay international footballers
Club Nacional footballers
Sevilla FC players
Recreativo de Huelva players
La Liga players
Paraguayan expatriate footballers
Paraguayan expatriate sportspeople in Spain
Expatriate footballers in Spain
Association football defenders